The following is a list of masters of Jesus College, Cambridge:

Masters
Jesus